Sigurður Ágúst Þorvaldsson (born 25 November 1980) is an Icelandic basketball player and a former member of the Icelandic national team. During his career, he won the Icelandic championship and the Icelandic Cup four times each. He was a four-time Úrvalsdeild Domestic All-First Team member and in 2005 he was named the Úrvalsdeild Domestic Player of the Year.

In 2010, Sigurður was found guilty of rape and sentenced to two years in prison.

Basketball career
After spending his first five seasons with ÍR and Snæfell, Sigurður signed with Woon!Aris Leeuwarden in Netherlands in 2005.

He later returned to Snæfell and in 2010, he was member of the Snæfell team that won all four major men's competitions in Icelandic basketball that year: the national championship, the Icelandic Basketball Cup, the Icelandic Company Cup and the Icelandic Supercup.

In 2017, Sigurður signed with KR. On April 28, 2018, he won his third Icelandic championship after KR defeated Tindastóll in the Úrvalsdeild finals.

On 4 May 2019 he won his 4th national championship after KR beat ÍR in the Úrvalsdeild finals 3–2.

Awards and achievements

Individual awards
Úrvalsdeild Domestic Player of the Year (2005)
4x Úrvalsdeild Domestic All-First Team (2005, 2007, 2009, 2010)

Club honours
4x Icelandic champion (2010, 2017, 2018, 2019)
4× Icelandic Basketball Cup (2001, 2008, 2010, 2017)
2x Icelandic Company Cup (2004, 2007)

National team career
Sigurður has played 56 games for the Icelandic national basketball team.

Legal history
In 2010, Sigurður was found guilty of raping a 17-year-old girl in November 2009 and sentenced to two years in prison. The Supreme Court of Iceland confirmed the sentence in 2011 after an appeal. He was released from prison in 2012.

References

External links
Úrvalsdeild statistics 2000-2007
Icelandic statistics 2008-present
Eurobasket profile

1980 births
Living people
Aris Leeuwarden players
Sigurdur Thorvaldsson
Sigurdur Thorvaldsson
Sigurdur Thorvaldsson
Sigurdur Thorvaldsson
Sigurdur Thorvaldsson
Sigurdur Thorvaldsson
Sigurdur Thorvaldsson
Sigurdur Thorvaldsson
Sigurdur Thorvaldsson
Forwards (basketball)